Trial and Error is a 1937 mystery detective novel by the British writer Anthony Berkeley. It was a loose sequel to the 1929 novel The Piccadilly Murder, featuring two of the characters from the earlier work the unprepossessing but shrewd Ambrose Chitterwick and Chief Inspector Moresby of Scotland Yard. Berkeley was a prominent author of the Golden Age of Detective Fiction, known for his inverted detective stories.

Synopsis
The mild-mannered Lawrence Todhunter finds out he hasn't long to live, due to a heart condition. He decides to do the world a last service by killing a truly evil person, knowing he will not have to face the consequences. However his plan goes wrong when the police arrest a completely innocent man for the murder. Despite his best efforts, Todhunter cannot convinces the authorities he is the guilty party and enlists Ambrose Chitterwick to try and prove the matter.

Television adaptation
In 1958 it was adapted into a six-part television series Leave It to Todhunter. Produced by the BBC it featured Mervyn Johns as Todhunter, Kynaston Reeves as Chitterwick and Ballard Berkeley as Moresby.

References

Bibliography
Baskin, Ellen . Serials on British Television, 1950-1994. Scolar Press, 1996.
 Herbert, Rosemary. Whodunit?: A Who's Who in Crime & Mystery Writing. Oxford University Press, 2003.
 Miskimmin, Esme. 100 British Crime Writers. Springer Nature, 2020.
 Reilly, John M. Twentieth Century Crime & Mystery Writers. Springer, 2015.
 Turnbull, Malcolm J. Elusion Aforethought: The Life and Writing of Anthony Berkeley Cox. Popular Press, 1996.
 White, Terry. Justice Denoted: The Legal Thriller in American, British, and Continental Courtroom Literature. Praeger, 2003.

1937 British novels
Novels by Anthony Berkeley
British crime novels
British mystery novels
British detective novels
Hodder & Stoughton books
Novels set in London
British novels adapted into television shows